HMS Tetrarch (N77) was a T-class submarine of the Royal Navy. She was laid down by Vickers Armstrong, Barrow and launched in November 1939.

Career

In common with many of her class, Tetrarch saw extensive service in the key naval theatres, Home waters, serving in the North Sea and off the French and Scandinavian coasts, and the Mediterranean.

Home waters

Tetrarchs first success came in May 1940 when she torpedoed and sank the German submarine chaser UJ B / Treff V in the Skagerrak.  She also sank the Danish fishing vessel Terieven and the German tanker Samland, and captured the Danish fishing vessel Emmanuel, which was taken to Leith as a prize.

Mediterranean

Tetrarch was assigned to operate in the Mediterranean in late 1940.  She sank the Italian merchants Snia Amba, Giovinezza and Citta di Bastia, the Italian tanker Persiano, the Italian sailing vessels V 72/Fratelli Garre,  V 113/Francesco Garre and Nicita, and the Greek sailing vessel Panagiotis Kramottos.  She also damaged the German merchant Yalova and claimed to have damaged a sailing vessel in the Aegean.  Tetrarch also carried out an unsuccessful attack on the Greek tanker Olympos.

Sinking

Tetrach sailed from Malta on 26 October 1941 for a refit in Britain, via Gibraltar. She failed to arrive in Gibraltar on 2 November and was declared overdue. Her route passed through a known minefield. On Monday 27 she communicated with P34, which was in the same area.  This was the last contact with the submarine.  She is presumed lost to Italian mines off Capo Granditola, Sicily, Italy in late October 1941.

Norman Walton, who later became the sole survivor of the sinking of  had visited the ship prior to its sailing to celebrate the birthday of a member of the Tetrarch, and upon realising it had sailed, he leapt off the ship and swam back to shore. His name had been added to the ships roll as it left port, and after the ship vanished his parents were mistakenly notified he was missing in action.

Notes

References

External links
 Interview with Ronald Mills, who commanded HMS Tetrarch from 1940 to 1941

 

British T-class submarines of the Royal Navy
Ships built in Barrow-in-Furness
1939 ships
World War II submarines of the United Kingdom
Lost submarines of the United Kingdom
World War II shipwrecks in the Mediterranean Sea
Maritime incidents in October 1941
Ships lost with all hands
Ships sunk by mines